Naila Kabeer (born 28 January 1950) is an Indian-born British Bangladeshi social economist, research fellow , writer and Professor at the London School of Economics. She was also president of the International Association for Feminist Economics (IAFFE) from 2018 to 2019. She is on the editorial committee of journals such as Feminist Economist, Development and Change, Gender and Development, Third World Quarterly and the Canadian Journal of Development Studies. She works primarily on poverty, gender and social policy issues. Her research interests include gender, poverty, social exclusion, labour markets and livelihoods, social protection, focused on South and South East Asia.

Early life
Kabeer was born in Calcutta, West Bengal, India, but her family migrated to East Bengal, (now Bangladesh) soon after. She went to school at Loreto Convent in Shillong in India. In 1969, she came to the United Kingdom for further education. She did her B.Sc. in economics at the London School of Economics, her M.Sc. in economics at University College London and then returned to the London School of Economics for her Ph.D. She completed her Ph.D. in 1985. Kabeer did her PhD fieldwork in a village in Bangladesh.

Career
In 1985, Kabeer joined the Institute of Development Studies at Sussex as a research fellow and later became a professorial fellow. In 2010, she joined the School of Oriental and African Studies, University of London as professor of development studies. In 2013, she joined the Gender Institute at the London School of Economics and Political Science as professor of gender and international development, where she has been since. Kabeer was the Kerstin Hesselgren Professor at the University of Gothenburg, Sweden in between 2004–2005 and Senior Sabaticant with International Development Research Centre Regional Office in South Asia between 2005 and 2006. She also worked as a senior research fellow at the Department for International Development, UK 2009–2010. She remains as an emeritus fellow at the Institute of Development Studies, Sussex.

Kabeer has been active in developing frameworks and methodologies for integrating gender concerns into policy and planning. She is a social economist and works primarily on poverty, gender and social policy issues. She has been active in developing frameworks and methodologies for integrating gender concerns into policy and planning and has experience of training and advisory work with governments, bilateral and multilateral agencies and NGOs (including Oxfam, ActionAid, Women for Women International, BRAC, PRADAN and Nijera Kori). as well as for a number of international development agencies (including the United Nations Development Programme (UNDP), UNICEF, World Bank, UN Women, and SIDA), and North American Aerospace Defense Command (NORAD). and DIFD. She is also on the board of the Women's Rights Program of the Open Society Foundations, of the International Centre for Research on Women which is an advisory committee of the International Labour Organization's Better Works Program.

Kabeer is the author of numerous books and journal publications. She is the author of Reversed Realities: Gender Hierarchies in Development Thought, Vero, 1994 and The Power to Choose: Bangladeshi Women and Labour Market Decisions in London and Dhaka, Verso 2000. She collaborated with UNRISD for the programme Social Effects of Globalization and wrote three papers: Gender, Demographic Transition and the Economics of Family Size: Population Policy for a Human-Centred Development in 1996; The Conditions and Consequences of Choice: Reflections on the Measurement of Women's Empowerment in 1999; and Leaving the Rice Fields but Not the Countryside: Gender, Livelihood Diversification and Pro-Poor Growth in Rural Viet Nam in 2000. For the UNRISD programme Gender and Development, she co-edited a Routledge/UNRISD book Global Perspectives on Gender Equality: Reversing the Gaze in 2007. Kabeer has worked with the United Nations Division for the Advancement for Women (DAW) as the lead author on The World Survey on Women and Development in 2009. For the UNRISD programme Social Policy and Development, she co-edited another Routledge/UNRISD volume "Social Protection As Development Policy: Asian Perspectives" in 2010.

Kabeer is currently on advisory editorial committee for the board of the Feminist Review Trust. She is also on the Advisory Committee for Better Work. She is currently engaged in research on social protection strategies and struggles for citizenship among workers in the informal economy. Kabeer is also involved in ERSC-DIFD Funded research on Gender and Labour Market dynamics in Bangladesh and India.

Selected bibliography

Books

Chapters in books

Journal articles

See also
 British Bangladeshi
 Feminist economics
 List of British Bangladeshis
 List of feminist economists

References

External links
 

1950 births
Living people
Bangladeshi emigrants to England
British people of Bangladeshi descent
Bangladeshi women writers
Bangladeshi writers
British women writers
Bangladeshi economists
British economists
British women economists
Feminist economists
Bangladeshi columnists
British women academics
British civil servants
Civil servants in the Department for International Development
British columnists
The Guardian journalists
British Asian writers
Writers from London
People from West Bengal
Alumni of the London School of Economics
Alumni of University College London
Academic staff of the University of Gothenburg
Academics of the London School of Economics
International Center for Research on Women
British women columnists
Socialist Workers Party (UK) members
Scholars from West Bengal
Presidents of the International Association for Feminist Economics